Henry Peirse  (c. 1754–1824) was a British politician who sat in the House of Commons for 50 years from 1774 to 1824.

Early life
Peirce was the son of Henry Peirse MP of Bedale, Yorkshire and his wife Anne Johnson. His father died in 1759 and he inherited the Bedale Hall estate. He was educated at Eton College from 1764 to 1770 and was admitted at Pembroke College, Cambridge on 3 July 1771, aged 17.  He undertook a Grand Tour which included Rome, Naples, Venice and Paris. While in Rome in 1775 his portrait was painted by Pompeo Batoni.  He married  Hon. Charlotte Grace Monson, daughter of John Monson, 3rd Baron Monson on 16 August 1777. Bedale Hall underwent some transformation under Pierce, and about 1777 he enlarged the house by incorporating into it an old Inn, so that the house became attached to the town houses on the west side of the Market Place. More significantly at some time a new stable wing was added to the house and a racing stud was established which became very successful.

Political career
The Peirse family had controlled one seat at Northallerton since the 17th century. While Peirse was under 21 the Lascelles family were allowed both seats. When he came of age he reclaimed his seat and at the 1774 general election was returned as Member of Parliament for Northallerton.  He counted himself a Whig and joined Brooks's in 1778.  In 1779 the Public Ledger described him as ‘a gentleman of very good character, and attached to Opposition from principle and conviction’. He was a member of the   St. Alban's Tavern group which in January 1784 tried to bring together Fox and Pitt. Although his attendance remained somewhat unpredictable he voted in many of the major issues. His final election was in 1820.

Horse Racing
Peirse operated a racing stud at Bedale Hall and had some success on the racecourse. He won the St Leger Stakes twice with Ebor in 1817 and  Reveller in 1818.

Peirse died on 14 May 1824.

References

1750s births
1824 deaths
People from Bedale
People educated at Eton College
Alumni of Pembroke College, Cambridge
Members of the Parliament of Great Britain for English constituencies
British MPs 1774–1780
British MPs 1780–1784
British MPs 1784–1790
British MPs 1790–1796
British MPs 1796–1800
Members of the Parliament of the United Kingdom for English constituencies
UK MPs 1801–1802
UK MPs 1802–1806
UK MPs 1806–1807
UK MPs 1807–1812
UK MPs 1812–1818
UK MPs 1818–1820